is a Japanese manga series written and illustrated by Kozueko Morimoto. It was serialized in Shueisha's You from 2000 to 2007, with its chapters collected in fifteen wideban volumes. The story follows Kumiko Yamaguchi, the granddaughter of a yakuza boss and teacher at an all-male private high school.

The manga was adapted into a three-season television drama, with Yukie Nakama in the title role, which was broadcast on Nippon TV from 2002 to 2008, followed by a theatrical film, which premiered in 2009. The manga was also adapted into a 13-episode anime television series by Madhouse, which was broadcast on Nippon TV in 2004. The anime series was licensed in North America by Media Blasters.

Plot
Kumiko Yamaguchi is the granddaughter of a yakuza boss, Kuroda of the Kuroda Ikka. However, her lifelong dream has been to become a teacher. While her grandfather approves of her choice, others in the family want her to become the next boss.

Kumiko becomes home teacher of class 4-2 in mathematics at an all-boys private high school, where she is known as "Yankumi". Her class is full of delinquents, but she tries her hardest to teach them not just academically, but about lessons of life. Though she is forced to keep her family a secret from the public, her yakuza upbringing gives her the strength and the experience to reach out to her students, while also providing comedic situations.

Characters

Kumiko is a 23-year-old university graduate and is newly hired at Shirokin Gakuen. She is very idealistic and wants to inspire her students and help them graduate high school. Since the age of 7, when her parents died, Kumiko has been living with her grandfather, who is the head of an influential Tokyo Ninkyo group. Despite this strange upbringing and the bizarre mannerisms she has picked up from it like her use of yakuza slang and a habit of running from the cops when she sees them, Kumiko is a good-hearted girl who has a strong faith in her students even when they think the world is against them. Her belief in them and her combat skills help her earn their respect. They give her the nickname "Yankumi," something she greatly likes. It is also revealed that she is attracted to men in a fundoshi; going into a trance when she saw Shin in one. In the 2008 SP manga, Yankumi finally returned Sawada's feeling after Sawada saved her from a gang of bikers. A running gag for the drama series is that with each new series almost everyone has completely forgotten she is next in line to run the yakuza, even when asking a fellow teacher from a previous series he replied only with a puzzled look on his face. Another running gag is in the beginning of each new series, she is shown incapable of teaching unless she is teaching the delinquents of the school and, more often than not, scaring her students with her unusual behavior.

Shirokin High School

18-year-old Shin is the leader of class 3-D (17-year-old leader of 2–4 in the manga). He is cool, level-headed, smart, and somewhat introverted. Everyone in the class looks up to him. When he was in middle school, he punched a teacher for refusing to apologise to an innocent student the teacher had been unfairly harassing. He knows right away that something is not normal about their new teacher and keeps an eye on her. He is the first one who found out Yankumi's true identity and later confesses to her [in the manga's last chapter] that he is in love with her. In the manga, he is given the alias of "Young Master Red Lion" from Kyou. Shin's father is a high ranking police official. At the end of the series he wanted to become a Yakuza lawyer so to be with Kumiko, and when he confessed to her, it appeared that everyone knew of his feelings for her, even the teachers, except for her. In the drama, his father is a senator. An amusing aspect of this series is that whenever he thinks he is on a mission to save Kumiko, he always gets beaten up and she continuously has to come to his rescue. He never returned in the sequels in the live-action series as he decided to go abroad as a social worker. While in the Special Manga 2008, Sawada is a top student of Toudai University and he has a stable life and job. As he is seen taking Yankumi out for a movie with his own car and constantly with her, stating why he was so cooperative with her back then was because he liked her at first sight and set up their casual meeting to turn it into a date. For the first time he is shown with emotion when one of Yankumi's new students tricks her into fighting a gang of bikers and he goes off to save her – he managed to save her.

He is one of Shin's friends. He always gets into fights, like everyone else. He had gotten into a fight with Ichiro Tsuruta, and was beaten by him. Minami is the tough guy of the group. In the anime and manga he is often seen with Noda, indicating a close friendship.

He is the guy with a weird purple hairstyle. In the drama, he has long hair that he bleached blonde. He is also one of Shin's friends. He was lost in Okinawa when they had a trip there and he gave Kumiko and Shin a lot of problems during that time. When they finally found him, Kumiko smacked him until his face was swollen. In the drama, he is a tough guy with a soft spot for his mother. His nickname is Uchi. In the manga, he is the first of the group to get a girlfriend when he starts a relationship with a horror-obsessed girl named Shiori. She constantly terrifies him with horror stunts. After a while, he seems to embrace her love of horror, even thinking about becoming a monster movie make-up artist.

Large and tough, Kumai (called "Kuma", or "Bear" by everyone) always seems to be getting into trouble. He is either getting into fights, or being accused of theft, or being attacked by a rival school. Kuma and Shin are best friends. They grew up together, and Kuma calls Shin "Shin-chan". Even Kuma's mother was friends with Kumiko before she became a teacher. He is also the only former student of Yankumi's shown in the second and third drama seasons. He eventually marries his first love and later becomes a father. Throughout the seasons he helps Yankumi when he sees her students getting into some kind of trouble and becomes a mentor to them as well. In each new series of the drama there is always a kid who greatly resembles Kuma in Yankumi's class.

He is also one of Shin's friends. He was the one who thought of giving Kumiko "Yankumi" as her nickname. Takeshi Noda is a member of class 2–4. Although not typically a main cast member, in one episode (in the drama), he becomes obsessed with the teacher Shizuka Fujiyama. Hurt when she threw away a present he gave her, Noda takes a picture of her at her secret second job:hostess of a bar. He then sends the picture to the head teacher and almost gets Shizuka put on probation for a week, to be fired if class 3-D does not get at least a 30 on their English mid-finals. In the manga, he is the first of his classmates to figure out that Shin likes Yankumi and gets Shin to admit so. In the manga, he is much more involved than in the anime or drama. He is also much smarter in the manga, like one instance when Ms. Fujiyama was being stalked, Noda made many suggestions as to how the stalker could follow Ms. Fujiyama. One thing he has in common with his drama counterpart is his sense in fashion, as demonstrated in the chapter of the manga "Protect our F-cup", where he dresses Yamaguchi in his sister's clothing in which Uchiyama and the others (first in disgust) found that the outfit worked well with her. He is often seen with Minami in the anime and manga, indicating a friendship between them, possibly being best friends.

Shizuka Fujiyama is another female teacher hired by Shirokin Gakuin at the same time as Yankumi. In the drama, Fujiyama teaches English. In the anime she teaches music. One of her students once attempted suicide and she learned a lesson because of that incident. She started a choir club in school. In the drama, Fujiyama wears her normal clothes all the time, but in the anime and manga she wears a tracksuit like Yankumi does. Fujiyama used to teach middle school students, and is very happy to be teaching at a high school. She jokes about which boys are cute, and whom she would sleep with. In the manga, she developed a crush on Kyo-san and tries to meet him, but she does not believe he is her "knight". Since she daydreamed him younger looking.

The School's Vice-Principal is Yankumi's main nemesis amongst the school staff. In episode 13 he was the 3rd person to find out about Yankumi's secret only to realize that she resigned. Also he tried to use a camera when he witnessed a fight only to be caught by Kyo. He is only majorly featured in the drama and anime. In the drama, despite initially antagonistic towards Yankumi and her class, he was undeniably portrayed as more benevolent than his anime incarnation. His state of benevolence was shown to be more prominent in Gokusen 2, where among the last few episodes, he deliberately informed Yankumi that her class attempted to boycott their graduation unless she calls off her resignation. It would seem that the drama-version Sawatori has grown to respect the headstrong and dignified educator that Yankumi is, despite knowing that he also risked getting fired in the process (he was poised for promotion). He was later seen a month after graduation, apparently assigned to another school (claiming to have resigned from the last one). He has a wife in the drama who runs an arranged marriage business, though he is constantly seen enjoying himself with younger women. A running gag in the drama is that he is able to instantly retain his status as Vice-Principal with each new school, even leading Yankumi to question how he does that.

The School's Principal. He does have a great knack for popping up suddenly at unusual times to point out useful information. In the manga and anime, the Koucho is this happy little bald guy who likes to wear bow ties. He knows that Yankumi is next in line to the yakuza, and discovered that was one of the main reasons he hired her, because he knew she would be able to easily handle that class.

Kuroda Family/Ooedo Clan

Kumiko's grandfather. He is a kindly, wise old man who loves Kumiko very much, and is always there to support her and give advice. He took Kumiko in after her parents died. He admits that he knows Yurikio(Kumiko's mother) left because she no longer desired to live like her father and mother. Though many rookies in the crime world might believe he runs a small branch of the Yakuza due to only having a few members, it is shown he is highly respected in the yakuza, and with a single command he could call upon thousands of members, as well as the few members that are with him are very strong and skilled at what they do, being able to take on a gang that clearly outmatched them in numbers with ease. This alone will scare smaller branches from even the thought of attacking him. He and the family are very respected around town as well, willing to do what they could to keep Kudou from escaping the Ooedo Clan. He is also shown to have a childlike personality as well, becoming moody at Shin when he believed he upset Kumiko.

Kyo is a tough-looking member of the Yakuza, but he is very close to Kumiko. When he was younger, and Kumiko was a little girl, her grandfather entrusted him to look after her. During that he took on the role of a parental figure; though often failed at it. Among his tasks, he taught her how to fight and defend herself when she was being bullied in school and teased because of her Yakuza connections (in the drama it was her grandfather who did this). It becomes clear, that over the years the two formed a father/daughter bond and she admits she often sees him as the closest thing to her dad. He later figures out that Shin is in love with Kumiko and wishes him the best of luck. He respects the Ooedo Clan and Kumiko very dearly, where even though he pretended to hit her to make it seem like she was in debt to the yakuza rather than a part of it to her students, he tried to kill himself (while flooding with tears) for raising his hand to her, or protecting Class 4 because they are her students. Yet this does not prevent him from wishing to kill them when he believes they upset her.

The young head assistant of the Kuroda family. He is very close to the group and is often seen either by Ryuichiro and Kyo-san, showing a friendship with the men. He is the only one of the group that is married and is extremely loyal to her. His wife Yusue owns a nightclub, that everyone visits. Like Kyo, he feels a close familial tie to Kumiko. 

Along with Tetsu, Minoru is a member of Kumiko's Yakuza group, and is one of her loyal followers. He and Tetsu watch over Kumiko and worry about her. Minoru and Tetsu can occasionally be seen running a takoyaki stand near Kumiko's school where they can be near her if needed. Sometimes their enthusiasm in serving her almost betrays her secret, but all they want to do is help. Kumiko took him in when he was a teen, calling him a 'younger brother' since the family did not accept underage kids, and he had nowhere else to go. In the manga, he dated Noda's older sister briefly. But she dumped him when he tried to do a legitimate job to please their father, leaving him heartbroken.

Tetsu is one of Kumiko's lackeys. He is a member of the Yakuza group, and is very devoted and protective of her. He and Minoru always keep an eye on Kumiko and do their best to help her when they can. In the drama, Tetsu seems to like Kumiko, but unfortunately he does not seem to have very good chances of getting romantically involved with her, as she considers him to be like family. Kumiko took him in when he was a teen, calling him a 'younger brother' since the family did not accept underage kids, and he had nowhere else to go.

He is Kumiko's old dog. He narrates the preview for the next episode. He is very loyal to Kumiko. He talks most of the time in the anime even though nobody can hear him (however Shin seems to be able to know what Fuji is thinking). Anime and manga character only, though a dog fitting Fuji's image can be seen in the drama.

Others

Shinohara is the lawyer that works for Kumiko's Yakuza group. Kumiko's grandfather helped Shinohara back when he was a law student, and Shinohara works for the Yakuza to repay the favor. Kumiko has had a crush on him for a long time where in the drama she gets a crush on the new guy of the series, oddly though the P.E. teacher showed genuine feelings for her but during the time she is too star-struck by her new crush to notice. In the manga it is possible he returned Kumiko's feelings, near the end he asks her to go back home with him. But after thinking it over, she declines and he understands. He is very well aware of Shin's feelings and encourages him to look after her. At the end of the series he returns to his hometown after his father was getting out of the hospital.

A former student at Shirokin Gakuen. He was a senior there until he was kicked out. He met Kumiko during her first week of school, when he tried to beat up Kuma. Then Kumiko, when she found Kudoh and his gang, gave them a worse beating. He joins the Nekomata Group and tries to frame the Ooedo Clan to get back at Kumiko. Back at Shirokin Gakuen he and the other seniors used to beat up the juniors whenever they could. By the end of the anime he kidnapped Kumiko in hopes of bringing down the Ooedo Clan, only to be beaten by Shin and the rest of the class from 2–4. In the manga he is later taken in by Kumiko, seeing that she needs to make him into a better man, though he fights her (unsuccessfully) at every step.

Tsuruta is known to be the strongest pupil in the school. He and Kudoh were the bullies to the juniors, and Tsuruta was eventually kicked out. He returns to school in Episode 9 for the festival thanks to the Vice-principal. The seniors basically used him to start fights with the juniors, until he and Kumiko secretly had a fight. Kumiko won and in return had Tsuruta stop being a bully and start hitting the books. Tsuruta may seem tough but he is actually a kind person and a good cook. He also shows up in episode 11 of the anime, to try to help the guys get Shin out. In the manga, he becomes part of Kumiko's class because honestly, he could not remember what grade he was in before being kicked out.

A boy who goes to Shirokin Gakuen. A good kid who keeps getting bullied by his so-called friends. Ms. Fujiyama wanted him to join the choir club because she thought he was cute and to get him away from his bad friends, and because he reminded her of a student she had in middle school who tried to commit suicide. He almost did commit suicide, if not for Kumiko and Shin who grabbed him in time before he fell off the roof. He is later shown in Ms. Fujiyama's choir club.

Media

Manga
Written and illustrated by Kozueko Morimoto, Gokusen was serialized in Shueisha's manga magazine You from 2000 to 2007. Shueisha collected its chapters in fifteen wideban volumes, released from August 23, 2000, to April 19, 2007.

A sequel,  (or Gokusen 2008), was published in You from December 28, 2007, to August 1, 2009. These chapters were collected in a single volume, released on January 19, 2010.

Drama

Season 1
The first 12-episode season of Gokusen was broadcast in Japan on Nippon TV from April 17 to July 3, 2002. It was followed by a special episode, which aired on March 26, 2003. The theme song is "" by V6. The first season was broadcast with English subtitles in the United States on KSCI in 2003.
Season 2
The second 10-episode season of Gokusen, Gokusen 2, was broadcast on Nippon TV from January 15 to March 19, 2005. The theme song is "" by D-51. It also includes an insert song, 
, by Kazuya Kamenashi, who portrayed the exclusive drama character Ryū Odagiri. The second season was broadcast with English subtitles in the United States on KSCI in 2005.
Season 3
The third 11-episode season of Gokusen, Gokusen 3, was broadcast on Nippon TV from April 19 to June 28, 2008. It was followed by a special episode, which aired on March 28, 2009. It also includes an insert song, by Hey! Say! JUMP's Yuya Takaki, who portrayed the exclusive drama character Yamato Ogata.

Film

The Gokusen television drama was followed and concluded by a theatrical film, Gokusen: The Movie, which premiered in Japan on July 11, 2009.

Anime

A 13-episode anime television series adaptation by Madhouse and directed by Yuzo Sato, was broadcast on Nippon TV from January 7 to March 31, 2004.

The series was licensed for English release in North America by Media Blasters, who released it on three DVDs, under its Anime Works imprint, from October 12, 2004, to March 1, 2005. The series aired in the United States on Encore WAM in 2006.

Reception
The Gokusen television drama was popular in Japan. The first season had average viewer ratings of 17.4% in 2002, while the second season jumped to 28.0% in average ratings in 2005. The last season had average viewer ratings of 22.8%, the highest average rating among other TV dramas that aired around the time.

In The Dorama Encyclopedia: A Guide to Japanese TV Drama Since 1953, by Jonathan Clements and Motoko Tamamuro, they wrote: "Gokusen begins in the style of GTO, but soon veers off course into a criminal variant of Romeo and Juliet.

The anime series was also frequently compared to Tooru Fujisawa's Great Teacher Onizuka. AnimeNation's John Oppliger wrote that the conflict between Kumiko's "masculine personality" and the Japanese cultural norms, trying to "conform her into a typical contemporary Japanese woman", resulted in an "enjoyable, humorous drama". Oppliger also praised the "subtle elements of yakuza movie", including the enka ending animation, which "added an additional level of charm to the show".

See also
Kōdai-ke no Hitobito, another manga series by the same author

References

External links
 
 
 
 

2000 manga
2002 Japanese television series debuts
2004 anime television series debuts
2008 Japanese television series endings
Comedy anime and manga
Japanese drama television series
Josei manga
Madhouse (company)
Manga adapted into films
Martial arts anime and manga
Nippon TV dramas
Shueisha franchises
Teaching anime and manga
Television shows written by Yasuko Kobayashi
Yakuza in anime and manga